Glochidion tooviianum is a species of tree in the family Phyllanthaceae. It is endemic to the Toovii Plateau on the island of Nuku Hiva in the Marquesas Islands of French Polynesia. Wagner and Lorence (2011) consider this species to be the same as Phyllanthus marchionicus (syn. Glochidion marchionicum), as both species are indistinguishable except for the presence of pubescence on G. tooviianum and the absence of pubescence on P. marchionicus/G. marchionicum.

References

Flora of French Polynesia
tooviianum
Near threatened plants
Taxonomy articles created by Polbot